McIntosh is a town in Marion County, Florida, United States. As of the 2020 census, the town population was 463. It is part of the Ocala Metropolitan Statistical Area.

History
McIntosh was platted in 1885 and named in honor of Col. John C. McIntosh, an early settler. A post office has been in operation at McIntosh since 1887.

Geography
It is bordered to the east by Orange Lake in Alachua County.

U.S. Route 441 passes through the town, leading south  to Ocala, the county seat, and northwest  to Gainesville.

Demographics

At the 2000 census , there were 453 people, 227 households, and 133 families in the town. The racial makeup of the town was 96.91% White, 2.43% African American, 0.22% Native American, and 0.44% from two or more races. Hispanic or Latino of any race were 1.55%.

Of the 227 households, 11.9% had children under the age of 18 living with them, 52.9% were married couples living together, 5.3% had a female householder with no husband present, and 41.4% were non-families. 34.8% of households were one person and 16.3% were one person aged 65 or older. The average household size was 2.00 and the average family size was 2.53.

The age distribution was 13.2% under the age of 18, 3.5% from 18 to 24, 19.2% from 25 to 44, 38.4% from 45 to 64, and 25.6% 65 or older. The median age was 53 years. For every 100 females, there were 81.2 males. For every 100 females age 18 and over, there were 81.1 males.

The median household income was $36,250, and the median family income  was $58,500. Males had a median income of $33,750 versus $20,500 for females. The per capita income for the town was $20,617. About 2.7% of families and 6.3% of the population were below the poverty line, including none of those under age 18 and 14.5% of those age 65 or over.

References

External links
 
 Ocala/Marion Visitors' & Convention Bureau
  McIntosh news and forum

Towns in Marion County, Florida
Populated places established in 1913
Towns in Florida
1913 establishments in Florida